State Route 153 (SR 153) is a state highway that runs southwest–to–northeast through portions of Webster, Marion, Sumter, and Schley counties in the west-central part of the U.S. state of Georgia. The route runs from Preston to Ellaville.

Route description
SR 153 begins at an intersection with SR 41 in Preston. It heads northeast through rural Webster County, before cutting across the extreme southeast corner of Marion County. It enters Sumter County to an intersection with SR 30. The route enters Schley County, and travels through rural portions of the county. It then meets its northern terminus, an intersection with SR 26 in Ellaville.

SR 153 is not part of the National Highway System, a system of routes determined to be the most important for the nation's economy, mobility and defense.

History
, the northern terminus of SR 153 was at US 19/SR 3 just south of Ellaville. By 2012, when a new four-lane bypass moved US 19/SR 3 east of the city, SR 153 was extended north to SR 26.

Major intersections

See also

References

External links

 Georgia Roads (Routes 141 - 160)

153
Transportation in Webster County, Georgia
Transportation in Marion County, Georgia
Transportation in Sumter County, Georgia
Transportation in Schley County, Georgia